Eskin-e Sofla (also Romanized as Eskīn-e Soflá; also known as Eskīn and Askīn) is a village in Dehpir-e Shomali Rural District, in the Central District of Khorramabad County, Lorestan Province, Iran. At the 2006 census, its population was 54, in 15 families.

References 

Towns and villages in Khorramabad County